Myrcia crassa is a species of plant in the family Myrtaceae. It is endemic to the municipality of Santa Teresa, Espírito Santo, Brazil, where its habitat is fragmented and declining due to deforestation. The tree was first described in 2010 and grows to between 1.5 and 18 metres tall.

References

crassa
Crops originating from the Americas
Crops originating from Brazil
Tropical fruit
Endemic flora of Brazil
Fruits originating in South America
Fruit trees
Berries
Plants described in 2010